USS Refresh (AM-287) was an Admirable-class minesweeper built for the U.S. Navy during World War II. She was built to clear minefields in offshore waters, and served the Navy in the Pacific Ocean. Post-war, her crew returned home with two battle stars to their credit. The ship itself was given to the Nationalist Chinese Navy.

Career 
Refresh, a minesweeper, was laid down 22 September 1943 by the General Engineering & Dry Dock Company, of Alameda, California, launched 12 April 1944, sponsored by Miss Muriel Maddox of San Francisco, California; and, commissioned 10 April 1945.

Following a Pacific coast shakedown out of San Pedro, California, Refresh reported to Commander in Chief, Pacific for duty 9 June 1945. After a call at Pearl Harbor, she departed 1 July for Okinawa via Eniwetok and Guam. Arriving Buckner Bay 31 July, she joined Commander, Mine Squadron 15 and began minesweeping operations in the Okinawa area 13 August. The last week of August she swept the approaches to Jinsen, Korea, and operated in the Yellow Sea through 7 September.

During the remainder of September, Refresh assisted task group TG 52.3 in minesweeping operations in the East China Sea approaches to Nagasaki and Sasebo, Japan, and in the Goto Archipelago, primarily in the area of Fukse, southwest of Kyūshū. Arriving Sasebo 1 October, Refresh was assigned several hydrographic missions, conducting soundings in shoal waters southwest of Kagoshima, Kyūshū, Japan. After upkeep in Sasebo, she continued to operate in Japanese waters through the new year.

Calling at Pearl Harbor 8–26 March 1946, Refresh then proceeded to San Pedro, California, arriving 4 April. Designated for transfer to the Chinese Navy 29 April 1946, she sailed for Subic Bay, Philippine Islands 17 September, decommissioned there 9 November 1946, was delivered to the Chinese 30 June 1948, and struck from the Navy list 13 July 1948. She served in the Navy of the Republic of China as Yung Chang (AM 51). On 13 November 1965 she was damaged by shelling by People's Liberation Army Navy patrol ships and then was torpedoed by the motor torpedo boat . She was then beached on Magong Island to prevent her from sinking.

Refresh received two battle stars for World War II service.

References

Admirable-class minesweepers
Ships built in Alameda, California
1944 ships
World War II minesweepers of the United States
Admirable-class minesweepers of the Republic of China Navy
Maritime incidents in 1965